Hydrology is the second album by Recoil, released January 25, 1988. It was Alan Wilder's second Recoil release. The CD and cassette version included the first release, 1+2.

Wilder was unable to promote his new album because of the onset of his band Depeche Mode's Music for the Masses Tour. Wilder described the project at this stage as "an antidote to Depeche Mode in some ways; a way to alleviate the frustrations of always working within a pop format."

Re-release

The CD of Hydrology Plus 1+2 was re-released in 2007, again on Mute Records.  The track listing and artwork remain the same.

Track listing
All music written by Alan Wilder.

"Grain" – 7:44
"Stone" – 14:32
"The Sermon" – 15:03

Credits and personnel
Alan Wilder - Production, Instruments
T + CP Associates - Sleeve photography and design

Notes

1988 albums
Mute Records albums
Recoil (band) albums